Robert Burrowes (1810 – 30 November 1881) was an Irish Conservative Party politician  who sat in the House of Commons from 1855 to 1857.

He was elected as one of the two Members of Parliament (MPs) for Cavan at a by-election in April 1855.
He did not contest the 1857 general election.

References

External links 
 

1810 births
1881 deaths
Members of the Parliament of the United Kingdom for County Cavan constituencies (1801–1922)
Irish Conservative Party MPs
UK MPs 1852–1857